Match of the Day is a BBC Books original novel written by Chris Boucher and based on the long-running British science fiction television series Doctor Who. It features the Fourth Doctor and Leela.

Premise
The Doctor and Leela uncover a conspiracy in a gladiator style game on an advanced unnamed planet.

External links

2005 British novels
2005 science fiction novels
Past Doctor Adventures
Fourth Doctor novels
Novels by Chris Boucher